CX 20 Radio Monte Carlo is a Uruguayan Spanish-language AM radio station that broadcasts from Montevideo and serves the whole country.

Established in 1924 by Carlos Romay, it belongs to a multimedia group that also owns the television channel Canal 4.

Selected programs
 Tempranísimo (variety).
 Informativo 930 (news).
 Aquí está su disco (on-demand music).
 Tangos a media luz (tango music).
 El tren de la noche (night entertainment).

References

External links

 Official website

Spanish-language radio stations
Radio in Uruguay
Radio stations established in 1924
1924 establishments in Uruguay
Mass media in Montevideo